Gullivers Cove is a community in the Canadian province of Nova Scotia, located in The Municipality of the District of Digby in Digby County .

References
Gullivers Cove on Destination Nova Scotia

Communities in Digby County, Nova Scotia
General Service Areas in Nova Scotia